The 1979 Bracknell District Council election took place on 3 May 1979, to elect all 40 members in 19 wards for Bracknell Forest Borough Council in England. The election was held on the same day as both the 1979 United Kingdom general election and other local elections as part of the 1979 United Kingdom local elections. Due to a boundary review there had been a change in ward boundaries, along with an increase in size from 31 members elected in 1976.  Despite losing government nationally, the Labour Party made up ground in Bracknell District from its landslide defeat in 1976.  Although the Conservative Party ended up with the same number of seats as 1976, the increased size of the council saw its majority reduced.  The Liberal Party lost its lone seat.  This would be the last time a candidate outside the three main parties would win at an all-out election.

Ward results

Ascot

Binfield

Bullbrook

College Town

Cranbourne

Crowthorne

Garth

Great Hollands North

Great Hollands South

Little Sandhurst

Hanworth

Harmanswater

Old Bracknell

Owlsmoor

Priestwood

Sandhurst

St. Marys

Warfield

Wildridings

Footnotes

References

Bracknell
Bracknell Forest Borough Council elections